Mellen Woodman Haskell (March 17, 1863 – January 15, 1948) was an American mathematician, specializing in geometry, group theory, and applications of group theory to geometry.

Education and career
After secondary education at Roxbury Latin School, he received in 1883 his bachelor's degree and in 1885 his M.A. and a Parker Traveling Fellowship from Harvard University. From 1885 to 1889 he studied mathematics at the University of Leipzig and the University of Göttingen, where in 1889 he received, under Felix Klein, his Ph.D. (Promotierung).<ref>{{cite book|url=https://books.google.com/books?id=uMvcfEYr6tsC&pg=PA209|author=Parshall, Karen|authorlink=Karen Parshall|author2=Rowe, David E.|authorlink2=David E. Rowe|title=The Emergence of the American Mathematical Research Community 1876–1900: J. J. Sylvester, Felix Klein, and E. H. Moore|series=AMS/LMS History of Mathematics 8|location= Providence/London|year=1994|pages=209–210|isbn=9780821809075}}</ref> In 1889 Haskell became an instructor at the University of Michigan. At the University of California, Berkeley, he became in 1890 an assistant professor, in 1894 an associate professor, and in 1906 a full professor. In 1909 he became the chair of U. C. Berkeley's mathematics department in succession to Irving Stringham, and remained the chair until retiring as professor emeritus in 1933.

Haskell was an Invited Speaker of the International Congress of Mathematicians in 1924 in Toronto and in 1928 in Bologna.

Selected publications
 1890: "Ueber die zu der Curve λ3μ+ μ3ν+ μ3λ= 0 im projectiven Sinne gehörende mehrfache Ueberdeckung der Ebene", American Journal of Mathematics : 1–52. 
 1892: "Note on resultants", Bulletin of the American Mathematical Society 1: 223–224. 
 1893: "On the definition of logarithms", Bulletin of the  American Mathematical Society 2: 164–167.  
 1895: On the introduction of the notion of hyperbolic functions, Bulletin of the American Mathematical Society 1: 155–159, from Project Euclid 
 1903: "On a Certain Rational Cubic Transformation in Space", The American Mathematical Monthly 10(1): 1–3.
 1903; "Generalization of a Fundamental Theorem in the Geometry of the Triangle", The American Mathematical Monthly 10(2): 30–33.
 1905: "The construction of conics under given conditions", Bulletin of the American Mathematical Society 11: 268–273. 
 1906: "The resolution of any collineation into perspective reflections", Transactions of the American Mathematical Society 7: 361–369. 
 1917: "The maximum number of cusps of an algebraic plane curve, and enumeration of self-dual curves", Bulletin of the American Mathematical Society 23: 164–165. 

As translator
 1893: Felix Klein, "A comparative review of recent researches in geometry", Bulletin of the American Mathematical Society'' 2: 215–249, from Project Euclid  (See also Erlangen program.)

References

External links

1863 births
1948 deaths
19th-century American mathematicians
20th-century American mathematicians
Harvard University alumni
University of Göttingen alumni
University of California, Berkeley College of Letters and Science faculty
People from Salem, Massachusetts
Roxbury Latin School alumni
Mathematicians from Massachusetts